The Beechcraft Model 17 Staggerwing is an American biplane with an atypical negative wing stagger (the lower wing is farther forward than the upper wing). It first flew in 1932.

Development
At the height of the Great Depression, aircraft executive Walter H. Beech and airplane designer Ted A. Wells joined forces to collaborate on a project to produce a large, powerful, and fast cabin biplane built specifically for the business executive. The Beechcraft Model 17, popularly known as the "Staggerwing", was first flown on November 4, 1932. During its heyday, it was used as an executive aircraft, much as the private jet is now, and its primary competition were the Waco Custom Cabin and Waco Standard Cabin series of biplanes.

The Model 17's unusual negative stagger wing configuration (the upper wing staggered behind the lower) and unique shape maximized pilot visibility and was intended to reduce interference drag between the wings (although it was later found to have negligible effect). The fabric-covered fuselage was faired with wood formers and stringers over a welded, steel tube frame. Construction was complex and took many man-hours to complete. The Staggerwing's retractable conventional landing gear, uncommon at that time, combined with careful streamlining, light weight, and a powerful radial engine, helped it perform well.

In the mid-1930s, Beech undertook a major redesign of the aircraft, to create the Model D17 Staggerwing. The D17 featured a lengthened fuselage that improved the aircraft's handling characteristics by increasing control leverage, and the ailerons were relocated to the upper wings, eliminating interference with the flaps. Braking was improved with a foot-operated brake linked to the rudder pedals.

Between April 1936 through May 1940 there were six Model 17 fatal accidents involving midair breakups that were attributed to weather conditions and structural failures, later determined to be caused by flutter of the ailerons and wings. The CAA Bureau of Safety Regulation initially issued an edict to restrict maximum airspeed and instrument flight, which was later replaced by a safety bulletin requiring lead balance weights to be added to the ailerons and flaps, and plywood panels to the outboard portion of the wings to increase torsional stiffness of the wing tip section.

Operational history
Sales began slowly. The first Staggerwings' high price tag (between US$14,000 and $17,000, depending on engine size) scared off potential buyers in an already depressed civil aircraft market. Only 18 Model 17s were sold during 1933, the first year of production, but sales steadily increased. Each Staggerwing was custom-built by hand. The luxurious cabin, trimmed in leather and mohair, held up to five passengers. Eventually, the Staggerwing captured a substantial share of the passenger aircraft market. By the start of World War II, Beechcraft had sold more than 424 Model 17s.

Air racing
The Staggerwing's speed made it popular with 1930s air racers. An early version of the Model 17 won the 1933 Texaco Trophy Race. In 1935, a British diplomat, Capt. H.L. Farquhar, successfully flew around the world in a Model B17R, traveling 21,332 miles (34,331 kilometers) from New York to London, by way of Siberia, Southeast Asia, the Middle East, North Africa and back across Europe.

Louise Thaden and Blanche Noyes won the 1936 Bendix trophy in a Model C17R Staggerwing. Thaden also won the Harmon Trophy for her achievement. The aircraft made an impressive showing in the 1938 Bendix race, as well.

In 1970, due to a dispute with the T-6 racing class, the Reno National Air Races invited five Staggerwings to perform a demonstration race. Two G models and two D17 models raced. The five pilots were Bryant Morris, Bert Jensen, Don Clark, Noel Gourselle, and Phil Livingston, the only pilot to have prior racing experience in the T-6 class. The race was flawless, with ABC Wide World of Sports coverage, but protesting T-6 racers prevented the class from future competition with allegations of safety issues.

World War II
As World War II loomed, a number of Model B17Ls were pressed into service as bombers by the Spanish Republican Air Force, the air forces of the Second Spanish Republic during the Spanish Civil War. China ordered a number of Staggerwings to use as air ambulances in its fight against Imperial Japan. Finland had one C17L as a liaison aircraft between 1940 and 1945. On October 2, 1941, Beech shipped a special camouflaged D17S to Prince Bernhard of Lippe, who was in exile in London after the German invasion of the Netherlands. He used it for refugee work in and around London. 

The Beech UC-43 Traveler was a slightly modified version of the Staggerwing. In late 1938, the United States Army Air Corps purchased three Model D17Ss to evaluate them for use as light liaison aircraft. These were designated YC-43 (Y designating a development aircraft or non-standard type, C standing for Cargo). After a short flight test program, the YC-43s went to Europe to serve as liaison aircraft with the air attachés in London, Paris, and Rome.

Early in World War II, the need for a compact executive-type transport or courier aircraft became apparent, and in 1942, the United States Army Air Forces ordered the first of 270 Model 17s for service within the United States and overseas as the UC-43 (USAAF designation for Utility, Cargo). These differed only in minor details from the commercial model. To meet urgent wartime needs, the government also purchased or leased (impressed) additional "Staggerwings" from private owners, including 118 more for the Army Air Force plus others for the United States Navy. In Navy service, the airplanes were designated as GB-1 and GB-2 (under USN designating convention signifying General (purpose), Beech, 1st or 2nd variant of type). The British Royal Air Force and Royal Navy acquired 106 "Traveller Mk. I" (the British name uses the UK double "l" spelling) through the Lend-Lease arrangement to fill its own critical need for light personnel transports.

The production UC-43 differed in minor details from the service test YC-43. Two distinguishing external features of the UC-43 are the circular automatic direction finder antennae mounted between the main landing gear and landing lights near the lower wingtips. They were all powered by the 450 horsepower (336 kilowatt) Pratt & Whitney R-985 engine.

Postwar
After the war's end, Beech immediately converted its manufacturing capabilities back to civil aircraft production, making one final version of the Staggerwing, the Model G17S. They built 16 aircraft, which they sold for US$29,000 apiece. Norway sold one D17S to Finland in 1949, which the Finnish Air Force used from 1950 to 1958.

The lightweight V-tail Beechcraft Bonanza, a powerful four-passenger luxury aircraft, soon replaced the venerable Staggerwing in the Beech product line, at about a third of the price. The Bonanza was a smaller aircraft with less horsepower, but carried four people at a similar speed to the Staggerwing. Beechcraft sold the 785th and final Staggerwing in 1948 and delivered it in 1949.

Critical praise
In March 2003, Plane & Pilot magazine named the Staggerwing one of its Top Ten All-Time Favorite aircraft.

In the April 2007 issue of AOPA Pilot magazine, it was reported that the Staggerwing was voted by nearly 3000 AOPA members as the Most Beautiful Airplane. "Members said it's the perfect balance between 'muscular strength and delicate grace,' and rated it highly for its 'classic lines and symmetry.'"

The November 2012 issue of Aviation History magazine ranked the Staggerwing fifth in their top 12 list of the Worlds Most Beautiful Airplanes. Stating that "Some might think 'the Stag' ungainly, backward wings and all, yet it has become the prime example of vintage beauty" and "...the aftward upper wing led to the big, steeply raked windscreen that is also a key element of what some have called an art deco classic."

Variants and design stages

17
Fixed gear prototype made first flight on November 4, 1932.
By 1934, Beechcraft had designed and built four models. They were the 17R (420 hp Wright engine); the A17F (690 hp Wright engine); the A17FS (710 hp Wright engine); and the B17L (225 hp Jacobs engine). All were fixed gear models with the exception of the B17L, which had a pneumatically retractable undercarriage. Of the three models, the B17L proved best suited to meet the market demands, and became the first production model.
B17
First production model, manufactured from March 1934 to March 1936.
B17B
 Jacobs L-5 engine. One built 1934.
B17E
 Wright R-760-E1 engine. Four built from 1935.
B17L
 Jacobs L-4 engine. 48 built.
SB17L
B17L fitted with floats. One built.
B17R
 Wright R-975-E2/E3 engine. 16 built from 1935.
C17
Manufactured from March 1936 to March 1937.
C17B
 Jacobs L-5 engine. 40 built.
SC17B
Floatplane version of C17B - One built.
C17E
  Wright R-760-E1.
C17L
  Jacobs L-4 engine. Six built.
C17R
 Wright R-975-E2/E3 engine. 16 built.
SC17R
 Floatplane C17R. One built.
D17
Manufactured from March 1937 to 1945 (All were military models after 1941).
D17A
 Wright R-760-E2. 10 built.
D17R
 Wright R-975-E3 engine. 27 built.
D17S
 Pratt & Whitney R-985-SB Wasp Junior. 23 built.
SD17S
Floatplane version of D17S.
D17W
 geared and supercharged Pratt & Whitney R-985-SC-G Wasp Junior. Two built.
E17
Manufactured from March 1937 to 1941.
E17B
 Powered by  Jacobs L-MB engine. 50 built.
SE17B
 Amphibian version of E17B. Four built. 
F17
Manufactured from April 1938 to 1941.
G17
Manufactured from 1946 to 1948.
Tachikawa-Beechcraft C17E Light Transport
20 built in licence production in Japan by Tachikawa, plus two assembled from imported parts for Dai Nihon Koku KK. Manshu, Chuka Koku and agencies such as provincial police headquarters.

Military designations

YC-43
Three Model D17S with a 450hp R-985-17 engine for evaluation by the United States Army Air Corps

UC-43 Traveler
Production version with a 450hp R-985-AN-1 engine, 75 ordered for the Army Air Corps and 63 for the United States Navy as the GB-1, 132 were later transferred from the Navy to the Army Air Corps.
UC-43A
Model D17R with 440hp R-975-11 engine, 13 impressed into service.
UC-43B
Model D17S with 450hp R-985-17 engine, 13 impressed into service.
UC-43C
Model F17D with 300hp R-915-1 engine, 37 impressed into service.
UC-43D
Model E17B with 285hp R-830-1 engine, 31 impressed into service.
UC-43E
Model C17R with 440hp R-975-11 engine, five impressed into service.
UC-43F
Model D17A with 350hp R-975-3 engine, one impressed into service.
UC-43G
Model C17B with 285hp R-830-1 engine, 10 impressed into service.
UC-43H
Model B17R with 440hp R-975-11 engine, three impressed into service.
UC-43J
Model C17L with 225hp R-755-1 engine, three impressed into service.
UC-43K
Model D17W, one impressed into service. This aircraft was originally built in 1937 for famed aviator Jacqueline Cochran. Cochran flew the airplane in the 1937 Bendix cross-country race and placed first in the Women's Division and 3rd overall. She also set a Women's National Speed Record of 203.895 miles per hour using the airplane.

GB-1
United States Navy transport version of the D17, ten bought in 1939 and ten impressed into USN service.
GB-2
USN version as GB-1 but with a 450hp R-985-50 or R-985-AN-1 engine, 271 built, 132 later transferred to USAAF as UC-43s. Also additional aircraft from a cancelled British contract and impressed aircraft.
JB-1
One Model C17R as an executive transport for the United States Navy.
Traveller I
British designation for the former US Embassy in London's YC-43 and 107 UC-43 and GB-2 aircraft delivered mainly for the Royal Navy.

Engine selection

Operators

Military

Numbers operated from

Royal Australian Air Force (operated three from 1941 to 1947)

Bolivian Air Force (received one in 1941)

NAB – Navegação Aérea Brasileira (airline)
Brazilian Air Force (operated 54 from 1942 to 1960)
Brazilian Navy (operated four from 1940 to 1941)

Chinese Nationalist Air Force (operated 21 from 1937 to 1945)

 Republic of China-Nanjing
Nanjing air force (operated one from 1941 to 1945)

Cuban Army Aviation Corps (operated two in 1945 and 1958)

Ethiopian Government (operated two from 1935 to 1936)

Finnish Air Force (operated one C17L from 1940 to 1945 and one D17S from 1950 to 1958)

Honduran Air Force (operated two from 1936 to 1958)

Netherlands Naval Aviation Service (one from 1942 to 1945)

Royal New Zealand Air Force
No. 42 Squadron RNZAF

Peruvian Air Force five from 1946 to 1958

Spanish Republican Air Force (operated nine in 1936)

Royal Air Force
Royal Navy - Fleet Air Arm
701 Naval Air Squadron
712 Naval Air Squadron
730 Naval Air Squadron
740 Naval Air Squadron
776 Naval Air Squadron
778 Naval Air Squadron
781 Naval Air Squadron
782 Naval Air Squadron
787 Naval Air Squadron
799 Naval Air Squadron

US Army Air Corps
US Army Air Force
United States Navy
Civil Air Patrol

Uruguayan Air Force (operated one from 1944 to 1962)

Aircraft on display

Brazil
 6691 – D17S on static display at the Museu Aeroespacial in Rio de Janeiro, Brazil.

United States
 1 – 17R on display at the Beechcraft Heritage Museum in Tullahoma, Tennessee. This airframe is the prototype Model 17.
 21 – B17L on display at the Beechcraft Heritage Museum in Tullahoma, Tennessee.
 93 – C17L on static display at the National Air and Space Museum in Washington, D.C. It was built as a C17B and originally owned by Buzz Aldrin's father.
 100 – C17B on display at the Beechcraft Heritage Museum in Tullahoma, Tennessee.
 231 – E17B on display at the Beechcraft Heritage Museum in Tullahoma, Tennessee.
 257 – F17D on display at the Mid-America Air Museum in Liberal, Kansas.
 305 – D17A on static display at the Evergreen Aviation & Space Museum in McMinnville, Oregon. This airframe was impressed into service during World War II as UC-43F 42-49071.
 333 – F17D on display at the Beechcraft Heritage Museum in Tullahoma, Tennessee.
 395 – D17S on display at the Beechcraft Heritage Museum in Tullahoma, Tennessee.
 2012 - D17S on display inside at the Clarksville Regional Airport and Jet Center at Clarksville, Tennessee. 
 4835 – D17S on display at the Beechcraft Heritage Museum in Tullahoma, Tennessee.
 4890 – UC-43 on display at the Yanks Air Museum in Chino, California. It has the USAAF serial number 43-10842. It was the museum's first aircraft and bears the seal of the U.S. Ambassador to the United Kingdom.
 6700 – GB-2 on static display at the National Naval Aviation Museum at Naval Air Station Pensacola near Pensacola, Florida. It has the US Navy Bureau Number 23688.
 6880 – UC-43 on display at the Fantasy of Flight in Polk City, Florida.
 6897 – D17S on display at the Lone Star Flight Museum in Houston, Texas. Registration N666TX.
 6913 – GB-2 on static display at the National Museum of the United States Air Force at Wright-Patterson Air Force Base near Dayton, Ohio. It is painted as UC-43 39-139.
 B-3 – G17S on display at the Beechcraft Heritage Museum in Tullahoma, Tennessee.
 B-7 – G17S on display at the Beechcraft Heritage Museum in Tullahoma, Tennessee.

Surviving aircraft

Many Staggerwings remain registered with the FAA in flyable condition, or undergoing restoration. Several military versions are on display.

Canada
 403 – D17S in storage at the Reynolds-Alberta Museum in Wetaskiwin, Alberta.
 4874 – D17S airworthy with Mark Hyderman of Edmonton, Alberta. It was previously owned by Vintage Wings of Canada in Gatineau, Quebec.

United Kingdom
 4803 – D17S airworthy at Old Buckenham Airport in Norwich, Norfolk.
 6701 – D17S airworthy at The Fighter Collection in Duxford, Cambridgeshire. It was built in 1943 as a US Navy model GB-2. It was shipped to the UK and flown by Royal Navy's 782 Naval Air Squadron as Traveller Mk.I FT475. Postwar, it was returned to the US and flown by the US Air Force before passing into private hands. It came back to the UK in 1990 and has since flown with several owners under the UK registration G-BRVE.

United States
 102/110 – C17B airworthy with Christine M. St. Onge of Wexford, Pennsylvania. It is operated out of Grove City Airport in Grove City, Pennsylvania. The aircraft is painted in the colors and scheme used by Blanche Noyes and Louise Thaden for the 1936 Bendix Air Race.
 198 – UC-43D airworthy at the Frontiers of Flight Museum in Dallas, Texas.
 3098 – D17S airworthy at the Legacy Flight Museum in Rexburg, Idaho.
 6704 – UC-43 airworthy at the National Warplane Museum in Geneseo, New York.
 6914 – D17S airworthy at the Historic Flight Foundation in Mukilteo, Washington.
 TBD – TBD airworthy at the Museum of Flying in Santa Monica, California.

Specifications (Beech Model D17S)

See also

References
Notes

Bibliography

External links

 Beechcraft Heritage Museum

Staggerwing
Biplanes with negative stagger
1930s United States civil utility aircraft
1930s United States military transport aircraft
Single-engined tractor aircraft
Aircraft first flown in 1932